was a town in Yasu District, Shiga, Japan.

On October 1, 2004, Chūzu was merged into the town of Yasu (also from Yasu District) to create the city of Yasu.

Dissolved municipalities of Shiga Prefecture